The Winisk River is a river in northern Ontario, Canada, that starts at Wunnummin Lake and flows east to Winisk Lake. From there it continues in a mostly northly direction to Hudson Bay. The name is from Cree origin meaning "groundhog".

The river is remote and not accessible by road. It is characterized by strong currents and whitewater while flowing off the Canadian Shield into the Hudson Bay lowlands. Here the river becomes broad.

Tributaries
Pipestone River
Asheweig River
Shamattawa River

Provincial Park

For most of the length of the Winisk River and its banks, from Winisk Lake to the Polar Bear Provincial Park, has been designated a provincial waterway park.

It is a non-operating park, meaning no fees are charged and no visitor facilities or services are present. Visitors must be experienced in travelling through isolated wilderness and skilled in handling whitewater.

See also  
List of rivers of Ontario

References

External links

Ontario Parks - Winisk River Official Website

Rivers of Kenora District
Tributaries of Hudson Bay